Newbury is a locality in central Victoria, Australia.
It lies between Trentham, Victoria and Blackwood, Victoria.

The television series The Man from Snowy River was filmed on location here. The locality is also home to a Buddhist monastery.

History

Environment

References

External links

Towns in Victoria (Australia)